Satyricon is a Norwegian black metal band formed in Oslo in 1991. Satyr and Frost have been the band's core members since 1993. The band's first three albums typify the Norwegian black metal style. Since its fourth album in 1999, the band has strayed from this style and included elements of traditional heavy metal in their sound. Satyricon was the first Norwegian black metal band to join a multi-national record label (EMI).

History

The band were formed in 1990 as Eczema by the bassist Wargod and drummer Exhurtum. In 1991, they decided to start playing black metal and change the band name to Satyricon. Satyr (Sigurd Wongraven) then joined the band. After the first demo All Evil, Exhurtum was kicked out of the band because he "preferred hanging out with my girl at the time rather than kicking down gravestones together with the band", while Wargod left the music scene and became a UN soldier afterwards. Remaining members Satyr and Lemarchand hired the drummer Frost (Kjetil-Vidar Haraldstad) as a session musician and recorded their second and last demo, The Forest Is My Throne. Shortly after this, Lemarchand also left the band. But before leaving the band he recorded guitars (uncredited on the booklet) for the first full-length album, Dark Medieval Times. In the meantime, Frost was being "promoted" as a permanent member and had recorded drums for the aforementioned album. Satyricon have—with two exceptions—been a two-man band ever since: from 1993–1996, Tomas Thormodsæter 'Samoth' Haugen from Emperor was the bassist and guitarist of Satyricon, and participated in the recording of their second album, The Shadowthrone; and later, in 1996, Darkthrone member Nocturno Culto (Ted Skjellum, known as "Kveldulv" during Satyricon's period) became guitarist on the third full-length Satyricon album, Nemesis Divina.

Rebel Extravaganza, Satyricon's fourth album, was released in 1999.  During this period Satyr drastically changed his look by shaving off his hair, as seen in the photoshoot for the album as well as their live performances around this time.

In April and May 2000, Satyricon toured as a supporting band for Pantera. Phil Anselmo has spoken of his love for black metal numerous times, and has participated in Eibon with Satyricon frontman Satyr. They used to be signed with Daron Malakian's music label EatUrMusic.

Their fifth studio album Volcano was released in 2002 and won four awards: the Norwegian Grammy for Best Metal Album, an Alarm award for the track "Fuel for Hatred" in the category Song of the Year, the Alarm Award for Metal Album of the Year and The Oslo award for Best Overall Album.

Satyricon participated in the Darkthrone tribute Darkthrone Holy Darkthrone, released by Moonfog Productions in 1998, covering the song "Kathaarian Life Code". In the same year, Satyricon participated in the Bathory tribute In Conspiracy with Satan – A Tribute to Bathory, released by Hellspawn Records/No Fashion Records, featuring the song "Born for Burning" originally released on Crusade from the North in 1996.

In 2006, Satyricon released Now, Diabolical.

In March 2008, the band headlined the Inferno Metal Festival in Oslo for the first time.

The EP My Skin Is Cold was released before their seventh album, The Age of Nero, which was released on 3 November 2008.

Satyricon released their self-titled eighth full-length album on 9 September 2013.

The band released their first ever Full Length live CD/DVD set titled Live at the Opera which took place in September 2013, alongside the Norwegian National Opera, on 4 May 2015.

A fully remastered 20th anniversary edition of 1996's Nemesis Divina was released on 20 May 2016.

According to recent updates on Satyricon's official Facebook page, they entered the studio in March 2017 to record their ninth full-length studio album titled Deep Calleth Upon Deep, which was completed in Summer 2017 and was released on 22 September. Frost had stated in recent interviews that once the new album was released, they would then complete work on their first ever covers album Formative Oddities, though they have yet to announce its release date. The band also revealed plans to release a new studio album with original material in 2022.

On June 8, 2022, the band announced their new album, Satyricon & Munch, would be released digitally on June 10, with physical releases to follow sometime in the future. The album features music created for the Satyricon & Munch exhibition held since April 29 at the Munch Museum in Oslo, Norway, which celebrates the life and works of Norwegian artist Edvard Munch.

Musical style 
The band's first album, 1993's Dark Medieval Times (recorded in 1993), showed off the fascination Satyricon had with the Middle Ages and featured raw black metal blast beats produced by Frost, mixed with acoustic guitar and flute. On their next album, The Shadowthrone, this medieval spirit was continued. Rock Hard journalist Wolf-Rüdiger Mühlmann wrote that Satyricon reached their "very early zenith" with that album and Nemesis Divina.

Describing their fifth studio album, 2002's Volcano, frontman Satyr stated in a press release and biography on their homepage that "the music is rock based but more extreme; it is black metal pushing the boundaries that began with bands like Venom and Bathory. Reinventing ourselves based on a foundation of rock-oriented black metal is our philosophy." Mühlmann wrote that Satyricon's path after their zenith was reached with their second and third album has only a limited connection to black metal, whereas Metal Hammer journalist Robert Müller described Satyr as a "latently arrogant guy who, along the way, makes great music that constantly tests the borders of the genre".

Band members

Current members 
 Sigurd "Satyr" Wongraven – vocals, guitars, keyboards, bass (1991–present)
 Kjetil-Vidar "Frost" Haraldstad – drums (1993–present)

Current live members 
 Steinar "Azarak" Gundersen – guitars (1999–present)
 Anders Odden – bass (2009–present)
 Anders Hunstad – keyboards (2011–present)
 Attila Vörös – guitars (2017–present)

Former members 
 Ted "Kveldulv" Skjellum – guitars (1996–1997)
 Tomas "Samoth" Haugen – guitars, bass (1993–1996)
 Carl-Michael "Exhurtum" Eide – drums (1991–1992)
 Vegard "Wargod" Tønsberg Bakke – bass (1991–1992)
 Håvard "Lemarchand" Jørgensen – guitars, bass (1991–1993)

Former live members 
 Dirk Verbeuren- drums (2014)
 Silmaeth – bass (2011–2012)
 Brice Leclercq – bass (2009–2011)
 Gildas Le Pape – guitars (2008–2013)
 Victor Brandt – bass (2008)
 Schoft – guitars (2007)
 Jonna Nikula – keyboards (2003–2011)
 Trym Torson – drums (2004)
 Joey Jordison – drums (2004)
 Ivar Bjørnson – keyboards (2003)
 Lars K. Norberg – bass (2002–2007)
 Arnt Ove "A.O Grønbech" Grønbech – guitars (2002–2007)
 Terje "Cyrus" Andersen – guitars (2000–2002)
 Kine Hult – keyboards (2000–2002)
 Jan Erik "Tyr" Tiwaz – bass (2000)
 Morten "Sanrabb" Furuly – guitars (1999)
 Terje Vik "Tchort" Shei – guitars (1997–1999)
 Daniel "Død" Olaisen – guitars (1996–1999)
 Richard "Daimon" Cabeza – bass (1997)
 Kenneth "Destroyer"/"Svartalv" Skibrek Halvorsen – bass (1996)

Timeline

Discography

Studio albums

Compilation albums

Split albums

EPs

Singles

Demos

Video albums

Music videos 

A music video was made for "To Your Brethren in the Dark", directed by Laban Pheidias. The video (the first from the band in nine years), features American actresses Tonya Cornelisse, Jesse Hotchkiss, Diana Wyenn and Shawn Kathryn Kane.

References

External links

 

 
Norwegian black metal musical groups
Musical groups established in 1991
1991 establishments in Norway
Century Media Records artists
Napalm Records artists
Nuclear Blast artists
Musical groups from Oslo
Heavy metal duos
Norwegian musical duos